Let's Play Cherry Bullet is the debut single album by South Korean girl group Cherry Bullet. The album was released digitally and physically on January 21, 2019, by FNC Entertainment. The single contains three tracks, including the lead single "Q&A".

Background and release
On January 7, 2019, FNC Entertainment announced via SNS that the group would debut with the single album Let's Play Cherry Bullet.

Concept images featuring each of the members were released from January 8 to January 12. The album contains three tracks, lead single 'Q&A", "Violet" and "Stick Out". 
The music video teaser was released on January 18. and the full music video on January 21 together with the single release.

Promotion
Cherry Bullet held a live showcase at the YES24 Live Hall in Gwangjin-gu, Seoul on January 21, where they performed "Q&A" along with "Violet" and "Stick Out".

The group started promoting their title track "Q&A" on January 22. They first performed the lead single on Mnet's M Countdown, followed by performances on KBS' Music Bank, MBC's Show! Music Core and SBS' Inkigayo.

Commercial performance
The song "Q&A" debuted at number 17 on the Billboard World Digital Songs chart.

Track listing

Charts

Release history

References

2019 debut singles
Korean-language songs
2019 songs
FNC Entertainment singles